The Adelaide Avalanche was a semi-professional ice hockey club based in the Adelaide suburb of Thebarton, South Australia. The Avalanche, founded in 1999, was a founding member of the Australian Ice Hockey League (AIHL). The team's home venue was the Snowdome Adelaide (now known as IceArenA). The Avalanche competed in the AIHL for eight years, from its inaugural season in 2000 until 17 June 2008, when the club was replaced with the Snowdome's own team, Adelaide A's (later rebranded Adelaide Adrenaline), after its AIHL licence was revoked due to financial issues. During the club's lifetime, the Avalanche won four AIHL premierships and two AIHL championships.

History

Foundation and ECSL (1999–00)

The Adelaide Avalanche was founded in May 1999 by the Oddy and Thilthorpe families to secure national ice hockey competition for South Australia and their sons. Steve Oddy and James Thilthorpe headed the fledgling club as owners and directors, Steve Oddy taking on the role of club chairman.

The Avalanche appointed John Botterill as inaugural head coach. He would be assisted by Neil Boyle. Australian international defenceman, Pavel Bohacik, was appointed the club's maiden captain.

Adelaide quickly joined the de facto national league, East Coast Super League (ECSL) in 1999, in what would prove to be the NSW administered ECSL's last season. The Avalanche's first ever competitive game was on the road in Sydney against the Canterbury Eagles. Adelaide defeated the Eagles 7-5 to register the club's inaugural victory. Steve's son Greg Oddy led the South Australian outfit's opening performance, registering two goals. Oddy and Thilthorpe personally arranged and paid for the travel of east coast teams to Adelaide in 1999. On 15 May 1999, Adelaide hosted its first competitive home game at the Snowdome in Thebarton.

AIHL era (2000–08)

Along with the Sydney Bears and Canberra Knights, the Avalanche were one of the founding members of the AIHL in 2000.  They finished first out of the three teams that year and claimed the inaugural AIHL championship.  In 2001, the club enjoyed the same success in winning their second consecutive title.

In 2002, the Melbourne Ice, Western Sydney Ice Dogs, and Newcastle North Stars joined the AIHL, expanding it to six teams.  The Goodall Cup, Australia's top prize in ice hockey, also became part of the AIHL that year.  Adelaide again finished second in the overall standings and lost to the Bears in the Goodall Cup final.

The Avalanche finished the 2003 season with their fourth straight minor premiership but lost to the Ice Dogs in the first round of a newly introduced four-team playoff system.  They would lose in the semifinals again in 2004 to the North Stars in double overtime.

As two more teams—the Brisbane Blue Tongues and Central Coast Rhinos—entered the league in 2005, the Avalanche returned to dominance by finishing first overall in the regular season standings.  The "curse of the minor premiers" again haunted the team. Despite winning through to the Goodall Cup final for the first time in three years, they were defeated 3–1 by the North Stars in that game.

The Avalanche have retooled for 2006 in the quest for their first-ever Goodall Cup, with their current roster boasting Mighty Roos players Greg Oddy and brothers Ben & Luke Thilthorpe. They finished second after the regular season and hosted the finals series, beating the Ice Dogs 5–2 to reach the final but losing the final 0-4 to the North Stars.

Members of the Adelaide Avalanche were featured on episode 11 of Network Ten's Cyber Shack TV on 10 October 2006. Both David Huxley and Brad Wanchulak played and reviewed the new NHL 2K6 on Xbox 360.

The Avalanche came into financial difficulties in 2008, and after being able to host several game at the start of the season, could not meet its road commitments, forcing the team to withdraw from the remainder of the season on 17 June. The team's players were transferred to the newly formed Adelaide A's, who in a deal with the AIHL was allowed to play the remainder of the Avalanche's season.

In 2022 the name of the Adelaide Avalanche was revived by a new team competing in the Pacific Hockey League.

Season-by-season record

Notes:

Notes References:

Honours

Championships

AIHL Championships (2000–01)1
 Champions (2): 2000, 2001
 Runners-Up (0):

Goodall Cup 
 Champions (0): 
 Runners-Up (3): 2002, 2005, 2006

V.I.P. Cup (2004–07)2
 Premiers (4): 2001, 2003, 2005, 2007
 Runners-Up (2): 2002, 2006

1 The first two season's of the AIHL did not have the Goodall Cup as the Championship prize. The Adelaide Avalanche is the only AIHL team to win the AIHL and not be crowned Goodall Cup Champions.
2 This list also includes Premierships won prior to the first trophy (VIP Cup) for Premiers came into existence in 2004.

Franchise Awards

Each season, between 1999 and 2007, the Avalanche held an annual awards night where the team awarded a number of player awards.

Players

Last roster

Team roster for the 2008 AIHL season

NHL players
A list of players that have played at least one game for the Avalanche and who have also played at least one game in the National Hockey League (NHL).

References:

International players
A list of players that have played at least one game for the Avalanche and who have also played at least one game for an international team at the World Championships organised by the IIHF.

References:

Player records
Avalanche all-time, season and game player records.

All-time

Season

Single game

Leaders

Team captains

The Avalanche had three captains in the team's known history. The captain in 1999 and between 2002-03 are currently unknown.

References:

Head coaches
The Avalanche had four head coaches in the team's history.

References:

General managers
The Avalanche had two general manager groups (GMs) in the team's history.

References:

References

External links

 Adelaide Avalanche's website
 AIHL official web site
 Elite Prospects Team Profile

Australian Ice Hockey League teams
Ice hockey teams in Australia
Ice hockey clubs established in 1999
1999 establishments in Australia
2008 disestablishments in Australia
Sporting clubs in Adelaide
Ice hockey clubs disestablished in 2008